Radoryż Smolany  is a village in the administrative district of Gmina Krzywda, within Łuków County, Lublin Voivodeship, in eastern Poland.

The village has a population of 480.

References

Villages in Łuków County